Sandy Ridges is a rural locality in the South Burnett Region, Queensland, Australia. In the  Sandy Ridges had a population of 89 people.

History 
Sandy Ridges State School opened in 1910 and closed in 1956.

In the  Sandy Ridges had a population of 89 people.

References 

South Burnett Region
Localities in Queensland